These are the full results of the 2006 European Athletics Indoor Cup which was held on 5 March 2006 at the Stade Couvert Régional in Liévin, France.

Men's results

60 metres

400 metres

800 metres

1500 metres

3000 metres

60 metres hurdles

Swedish relay (800/600/400/200 metres)

High jump

Long jump

Shot put

Women's results

60 metres

400 metres

800 metres

1500 metres

3000 metres

60 metres hurdles

Swedish relay (800/600/400/200 metres)

Pole vault

Triple jump

References

European Athletics Indoor Cup
European